The Socialism and Liberty Party (PSOL ) is a left-wing political party in Brazil. The party describes itself as socialist and democratic.

The party leader is Juliano Medeiros and the federal deputies Ivan Valente, Marcelo Freixo, Talíria Petrone, Sâmia Bomfim, Áurea Carolina, Edmilson Rodrigues, Fernanda Melchionna, David Miranda, Glauber Braga and Luiza Erundina, with a number of well-known Brazilian left-wing leaders and intellectuals, such as Guilherme Boulos, Hamilton Assis, Michael Löwy, Luciana Genro, João Machado,  and others.

PSOL was formed after Heloísa Helena, Luciana Genro, Babá and João Fontes (also a federal deputy, now a member of the Democratic Labour Party, PDT) were expelled from the Workers' Party after voting against the pension reform proposed by Lula. They opposed the decisions of Lula's government, considering them to be too liberal, and the Workers' Party alliances with polemic right-wing politicians, such as the former presidents José Sarney and Fernando Collor.

After collecting more than 438,000 signatures, PSOL became Brazil's 29th officially recognized political party, the first to do so by this method.

Ideology and support
The ideology of the party varies between the left and the far left. The programmatic elements found in the party are related to socialism, anti-capitalism, and anti-imperialism. There are Marxist, Trotskyist, eco-socialist, and labor unionism tendencies within the party. Among other things, the party program includes the reduction of working hours, agrarian and urban reform, increased spending on health, education and infrastructure, and a break with the International Monetary Fund. It also seeks to decriminalize abortion. Because it is a party formed by trends that possess the political spectrum of the left in common, they represent distinct divisions in question of origin, geographical location and composition of its leaderships. The formation of tendencies provided for in the party statute can be freely organized without direct interference from the party leadership, allowing autonomy of intra-party groups, provided they follow the political prerogatives of the party's statute and program.

Internal tendencies

PSOL also allows certain unregistered political parties to launch candidates through its TSE registry number. These organizations, however, cannot participate in the party's congresses.

Members of the National Congress
Following the 2018 general election, PSOL currently has ten federal deputies in the National Congress of Brazil. Although having a small presence in parliament, PSOL is the 5th most popular party in Brazil, and it is recognized as different from the bigger PSDB and PT parties and the cronyist and catch-all parties without an ideology.

Federal Deputies

State Deputies

Mayors

Clécio Luís, Mayor of Macapá, left the party to join Sustainability Network.

Elections

2006
PSOL launched Heloísa Helena to run for president in 2006 elections. The vice-presidential candidate was intellectual . The party ran in a left-wing ticket along with two other parties: Trotskyist Unified Workers' Socialist Party (PSTU) and Marxist–Leninist Brazilian Communist Party (PCB).

The alliance was extended to gubernatorial elections. In Minas Gerais, for instance, Vanessa Portugal, from the PSTU, ran for governor with PSOL's support, although not with PCB's. Prominent PSOL gubernatorial candidates were Plínio de Arruda Sampaio in São Paulo,  in Rio de Janeiro and Roberto Robaina in Rio Grande do Sul. However, they were all defeated.

Heloísa Helena finished the presidential race in the third place, receiving 6.5 million votes throughout the country (6.85% of the valid votes). Three federal deputies, Luciana Genro, Chico Alencar and Ivan Valente, managed to get re-elected.

2010
In the 2010 candidate for presidential election Plínio de Arruda Sampaio received 888.000 votes (0.87%). Plinio presented an agrarian reform project in 1964 when he was federal deputy, but the 1964 Military Coup ended the project and Plinio lost his mandate. Although he received very few votes Plinio became famous after the elections because he was qualified as an anti-candidate.

PSOL elected three deputies again, Chico Alencar, Ivan Valente and Jean Wyllys.

Toninho do PSOL from Federal District got the best gubernatorial result. He finished in third place with 14.25%.

2012
In 2012 PSOL got its best results so far. Clecio Luis and Gelsimar Gonzaga were elected mayors in Macapá, Amapá's state capital, and Itaocara.

In the northern second largest city Belém and in Rio de Janeiro, PSOL finished second and elected four city councillors – the second largest group in those councils. In Belem Edmilson Rodrigues got 43.39% and in Rio de Janeiro Marcelo Freixo got 28.15%, almost 1 million votes.

Other places like São Paulo, Fortaleza, Campinas, Belo Horizonte, Curitiba, Salvador, Natal, Florianópolis, Niterói, São Gonçalo and Pelotas, PSOL got respectable results in 2012, 49 city councillors from PSOL were elected.

2014
PSOL initially nominated Randolfe Rodrigues, the Senator for Amapá, as their candidate for President in 2014, with former federal deputy and party co-founder Luciana Genro as his running mate. Federal deputy Chico Alencar of Rio de Janeiro and attorney  also ran for the party's nomination. However, he was replaced at the top of the ticket by Genro, a member of the Left Socialist Movement faction. She got 1,612,186 votes finishing in 4th place.

Genro's campaign received the support of important Brazilian intellectuals and celebrities. These included like Chico de Oliveira, Rogério Arantes, Vladimir Safatle, Michel Löwy, Gregorio Duvivier, Valesca Popozuda, Zélia Duncan, Karina Buhr, Clara Averbuck, Marina Lima, Juca Kfouri, Preta Gil, Laerte Coutinho, Marcelo Yuka and the international popstar Jessica Sutta. Her candidacy was well-regarded in the LGBT community.

PSOL elected 5 federal deputies and 12 state deputies. Marcelo Freixo (RJ) received the highest vote for a state deputy in Brazil with 350,408 votes. Carlos Giannazi was the leftist most voted in São Paulo with 164,929 votes.

Gubernatorial candidates Tarcísio Motta (RJ) with 8.92% (14.62% in city of Rio Janeiro) and Robério Paulino (RN) with 8.74% (22.45% in capital Natal) got excellent results. Senate candidate Heloísa Helena (AL) got 31.86%, but she lost the election to former Brazilian president Fernando Collor de Mello, who was impeached.

2018 
In 2018, PSOL chose prolific labor leader Guilherme Boulos as their nominee for the presidency. Boulos's close affiliation with former President Lula led to concern that his nomination would erode PSOL's distinct identity. It was alleged that party leadership pushed Boulos at the expense of other pre-candidates for the party's nomination, including economist (and son of 2010 presidential nominee Plínio de Arruda Sampaio) Plínio de Arruda Sampaio Jr., activist and educator Hamilton Assis, and academic Nildo Ouriques. Indigenous leader Sônia Guajajara, who initially sought the party's nomination, was chosen to serve as his vice presidential running mate.

2022 
On 30 April, PSOL made official its support for the pre-candidacy of Luiz Inácio Lula da Silva (PT) for the presidency. The party approved its support during electoral conference. On the 7 May, PT made official the pre-candidacy of ex-president Lula and ex-governor of São Paulo Geraldo Alckmin (PSB) to run for president. In June, a group of PSOL affiliates created a dissident movement of the party in protest against the support to the pre-candidacy of former president Luiz Inácio Lula da Silva (PT) and former governor Geraldo Alckmin (PSB) for the presidency.

Electoral results

Presidential

Legislative elections

References

 
2004 establishments in Brazil
Democratic socialist parties in South America
Ecosocialist parties
Far-left political parties
Far-left politics in Brazil
Left-wing parties
Left-wing politics in Brazil
Libertarian socialist parties
Multi-tendency organizations
Political parties established in 2004
Political parties in Brazil
Progressive parties
Secularism in Brazil
Secularist organizations
Socialist parties in Brazil